Maibal railway station is located in Pakistan.

See also
 List of railway stations in Pakistan
 Pakistan Railways

References

External links

Railway stations in Bhakkar District
Railway stations on Kotri–Attock Railway Line (ML 2)